The Roman Catholic Diocese of Évreux (Latin: Dioecesis Ebroicensis; French: Diocèse d'Evreux) is a Roman Catholic diocese in France. The diocese comprises the department of Eure within the Region of Normandy. The diocese is a suffragan of the Archdiocese of Rouen, and the current bishop is Christian Nourrichard, who was appointed in 2006.

History
Tradition has it that the diocese of Évreux was founded by Saint Taurinus. That tradition claims that he was born during the reign of the Roman Emperor Domitian (81-96), and was baptized by Pope Clement I (ca, 91-101). He set out for Gaul in the company of Saint Denis, who founded the Church of Paris. He went on an embassy to Rome, where he received the blessing of Pope Sixtus (ca. 116-125), after which he returned to Gaul. Shortly after the death of Sixtus, the barbarians overran the province. The last remark, on top of the unlikeliness of the other statements, makes it clear that the story is fiction.  An attempt to fix the chronology places Taurinus in the time of Sixtus II (257-258), not Sixtus I. There were indeed barbarian incursions under the Emperor Gallienus (253-268) in those years, and Saint Denis is usually put in the third century; but then the part of the story involving Taurinus' first-century origins must be jettisoned, leaving practically nothing; and one must admit that the third-century date depends on a scholarly conjecture.

Other writers suggest other dates.  Chassant and Sauvage opt for dates of ca. 380–410. Le Brasseur indicates a preference for the time of the Vandals in the fifth century, but neither presents any evidence. Gams assigns a date of 412 in his list of Bishops of Évreux, and provides a day of death, 11 August. Fisquet provides a rationale for the date of 412, but it too is composed of suppositions and conjectures, not facts. In reality there are no facts at all.

There is, however, a body. The remains were discovered by an inhabitant of Évreux named Laudulphus, who had retired to a nearby cave for prayer and meditation. In a dream he heard a heavenly choir chanting that the day was the Feast of Saint Taurinus.Laudulphus set off to inform his bishop, Bishop Viator, but amazingly the bishop died before Laudulphus could tell him the tale. Laudulphus was elected Viator's successor, and he immediately had a second vision, of a column extending from heaven to a certain spot on earth, where, upon investigation, they found a tomb, conveniently supplied with the inscription: HIC REQUIESCIT BEATUS TAURINUS, PRIMUS EPISCOPUS EBROICAE CIVITATIS ('Here lies Blessed Taurinus, first Bishop of Évreux). A little wooden chapel was built on the spot, out of which grew the Abbey of Saint-Taurin. During the invasions of the Northmen under Rollo (ca. 875 ff.), the body was moved twice, first to the Auvergne and then to Castrum Laudosum (Lezoux). When the remains were taken up, the translators found the inscription just quoted, which may have given rise to an element in the traditional story. The sack of Évreux by Rollo was witnessed by Bishop Seibardus.

In the eighteenth century the Chapter of the Cathedral had a Dean, three archdeacons (Évreux, Neubourg and Ouche), a Treasurer, a Cantor, and a Penitentiary; there were thirty-one Canons, of whom the Abbot of Bec was the first. Eight of the senior canons were considered barons, and the most senior was the Baron of Angerville. There was also a Succentor and forty-five chaplains. There were some 550 parish churches in the diocese, of which eight were in Évreux itself.

Cathedral
Part of the lower portion of the nave of Évreux Cathedral dates from the 11th century; the west facade with its two ungainly towers is, for the most part, the work of the late Renaissance, and various styles of the intervening period are represented in the rest of the church. A thorough restoration was completed in 1896. The elaborate north transept and portal are in the flamboyant Gothic. The choir, the finest part of the interior, is in an earlier Gothic style. Cardinal de la Balue, bishop of Évreux in the latter half of the 15th century, constructed the octagonal central tower, with its elegant spire; to him is also due the Lady chapel, which is remarkable for its finely preserved stained glass. Two rose windows in the transepts and the carved wooden screens of the side chapels are masterpieces of 16th-century workmanship.

The episcopal palace, a building of the 15th century, adjoins the south side of the cathedral. An interesting belfry, facing the handsome modern town hall, also dates from the 15th century. The church of St Taurin, in part Romanesque, has a choir of the 14th century and other portions of later date; it contains the shrine of St Taurin, a work of the 13th century.

From 1982 to 1995 the bishop of Évreux was the dissident cleric Jacques Gaillot who was subsequently demoted to the titular see of Partenia.

Bishops

To 1000

 ? Saint Taurinus (Taurin) 
 ? Maximus (Mauxe)
 ? Etherius
 Gaud d'Évreux 440–480
 Maurusius 511 (Council of Orléans)
 Licinius (Councils of Orleans of 538, 541 and 549)
 Ferrocinctus attested in 557 (Council of Paris of 557)
 Viator
 Laudulfus 585
 Erminulfus 615 (attendee Council of Paris, 10 October 615)
 Waldus (Gaud) ca. 648
 Ragnericus 650
 Concessus ca. 667
 Aeternus (Ethernus, Detherus, Eterne) around 670
 Aquilinus (Aquilin) 673–695
 Desiderius (Didier) after 684, and before 692.
 Stephan c. 752
 Maurinus (attested in 762)
 Gervold 775–787 (resigned to become Abbot of Fontanelle)
 Ouen
 Joseph 833–846
 Guntbertus 847–863
 Hilduinus 864–870
 Sebardus (Sébar) 870–893
 Cerdegarius attested ca. 893 ?
 Hugo (Hugues) attested in 933
 Guichard (Guiscard, called Gunhard by Mabillon) ca. 954 – ca. 970
 Gérard (Géraud) ca. 970 – ca. 1011

1000–1300

 Gilbert around 1012–1014
 Hugo (Hugues) 1014–1046
 Guillaume Flertel 1046–1066
 Bauduin (Baldwin) 1066–1070
 Gilbert (d'Arques) 1071–1112 (Giffard)
 Audin de Bayeux or Ouen 1113–1139
 Rotrou de Warwick 1139–1165
 Gilles du Perche 1170–1179
 Jean (John Fitz Luke) 1180–1192
 Garin de Cierrey 1193–1201
 Robert de Roye 1201–1203
 Lucas 16 February 1203 – 30 January 1220
 Raoul de Cierrey 2 June 1220 – 18 March 1223
 Richard de Bellevue 17 July 1223 – 4 April 1236
 Raoul de Cierrey 2 June 1236 – 1 January 1243
 Jean de La Cour d'Aubergenville 1244–1256
[Sede Vacante 1256 – 1259]
 Raoul de Grosparmi 1259–1263 (named Cardinal Bishop of Albano)
 Raoul de Chevry (Chevriers) 1263–1269
 Philippe de Chaourse 1270–1281
 Nicolas d'Auteuil 1281 – 17 May 1298
 Gaufredus (Geoffrey) de Bar 1298 – 18 April 1299
 Mathieu des Essarts 1299 – 1 October 1310

1300–1500

 Geoffroy du Plessis 1310 – 13 November 1327
 Adam de L'Île † 1328 (never consecrated)
 Jean du Prat 1329–1333
 Guillaume des Essarts 1333–1334
 Vincent des Essarts 1334–1335
 Geoffroy de Faé 1335–1340
 Robert de Brucourt 1340–1374
 Guillaume D`Estouteville 1374–1376
 Bernard de Caritis 1376–1383
 Philippe de Moulins 1384–1388
 Guillaume de Vallau 1388–1400
 Guillaume de Cantiers 1400–1418
 Paolo Capranica 1420–1427 (never visited Normandy)
 Martial Formier 1427–1439
 Pasquier de Vaux 1439–1443
 Pierre I. de Treignac de Comborn 1443–1463
 Guillaume de Flocques 7 January 1425 – November 1464
 Jean IV de La Balue 1464–1467
 Pierre Turpin de Crissé 1470–1473
 Jean Héberge 1473–1479
 Raoul du Faon 1479–1511

1500–1700

 Ambroise Le Veneur de Tillières 1511–1531
 Gabriel Le Veneur de Tillières 1531–1574
 Claude de Sainctes 1575–1591
 Jacques Davy Duperron 1591–1606 (Cardinal, 1603–1618)
 Guillaume de Péricard 1608–1613
 François de Péricard 1613–1646
 Jacques Le Noël du Perron 30 August 1646 – 17 February 1649
 Gilles Boutaut 15 November 1649 – 1661
 Joseph Zongo Ondedei, Bishop of Fréjus (refused the royal appointment to Évreux in March 1661)
 Henri Cauchon de Maupas du Tour 1664–1680
 Louis-Joseph de Grignan 1681
 Jacques Potier de Novion 1682–1709 (later Bishop of Sisteron)

1700–1800

 M. de Heudicourt 1709
 Jean Le Normand 10 November 1710 – 7 May 1733
 Pierre-Jules-César de Rochechouard-Montigny (15 February 1734 – 1753) (transferred to Bayeux)
 Arthur-Richard Dillon (26 September 1753 – 18 July 1758) (transferred to Toulouse)
 Léopold-Charles Choiseul de Stainville (1758–1759)
 Louis-Albert de Lézay-Marnésia (1759–1773)
 François de Narbonne-Lara (1774–1792)
 Robert Thomas Lindet (1791–1793) (Constitutional Bishop of l'Eure)
 Charles Robert Lamy (1799–1801) (Constitutional Bishop of l'Eure)

1802–1900
 Jean-Baptiste Boulier (1802 – 30 October 1821)
 Charles-Louis Salmon du Châtelier (1821–1841)
 Nicolas-Théodore Olivier (1841–1854)
 Henri-Marie-Gaston Boisnormand de Bonnechose (1854–1858) (also Archbishop of Rouen)
 Jean-Sébastien-Adolphe Devoucoux (1858–1870)
 François Grolleau (1870–1890)
 François Hautin (1890–1893) (also Archbishop of Chambéry)
 Louis-François Sueur (1894–1896) (also Archbishop of Avignon)
 Marie-Simon-Henri Colomb (1896–1898)
 Philippe Meunier (1898–1913)

From 1900
 Louis-Jean Dechelette (1913–1920)
 Constantin-Marie-Joseph Chauvin (1920–1930)
 Alphonse-Paul-Désiré Gaudron (1930–1964)
 Antoine Caillot (1964–1972)
 Jean Marcel Honoré (1972–1981), appointed Archbishop of Tours; future Cardinal
 Jacques Jean Edmond Georges Gaillot (1982–1995), removed and was appointed titular bishop of Partenia instead of becoming bishop emeritus of this diocese
 Jacques Louis Antoine Marie David (1996–2006)
 Christian Nourrichard (2006–present)

See also
Catholic Church in France

References

Bibliography

Reference works

 pp. 549–551. (Use with caution; obsolete)
  (in Latin) p. 234.
 (in Latin) p. 148.
 p. 190.
 pp. 179–180.
 pp. 191.
 p. 204.

Studies

  Instrumenta, pp. 123–152.

External links
  Centre national des Archives de l'Église de France, L’Épiscopat francais depuis 1919, retrieved: 2016-12-24.

Roman Catholic dioceses in France
Évreux